General Steven Rockwell Trevor is a fictional character appearing in American comic books published by DC Comics, commonly in association with the superhero Wonder Woman. The character was created by William Moulton Marston and first appeared in All Star Comics #8 (December 1941). Steve Trevor is a trusted friend, love interest, and partner who introduces Diana (Wonder Woman) to "Man's World", and has served as Wonder Woman's United Nations liaison. He is the first foreigner to have ever set foot on Themyscira and the first ambassador to open diplomatic relations with the Amazons.

The character has appeared in various adaptations of the comics. He has been voiced by actors such as Tahmoh Penikett, Nathan Fillion, and George Newbern, among others in various Wonder Woman and Justice League productions. Lyle Waggoner portrayed the character in the 1970s Wonder Woman series, while Chris Pine portrayed him in the DC Extended Universe films Wonder Woman (2017) and Wonder Woman 1984 (2020).

Publication history
Steve Trevor first appeared in All Star Comics #8 (December 1941).

Pre-Crisis
Steve Trevor was originally introduced as an intelligence operative and officer in the United States Army Air Corps who became stranded on Wonder Woman's homeland where he was a herald to the Amazons that World War II was occurring in "Man's World". He also developed a close relationship with the heroine. Though a military man with experience in the field, storylines involving post-Marston Steve and Wonder Woman also involved Wonder Woman coming to Steve's rescue, as well as vice versa.

The character was killed off in Wonder Woman #180 (January - February 1969), shot by the henchmen of Doctor Cyber. In a WW letter column in issue #195, artist Mike Sekowsky explained, "Steve Trevor was dull and boring and I didn't like him much, so I disposed of him." The character was later resurrected by another creative team.

Steve's visibility in comics varied through the 1970s to the 1990s, with his character either absent or sidelined in favour of fantasy and action-adventure Wonder Woman stories without romantic interests.

Post-Crisis
In more recent portrayals, and particularly since DC's 2011 reboot, Steve is portrayed as a senior government agent and super spy whose close connection to Wonder Woman makes him the United States' liaison to the Justice League. In 2013, in his capacity as a skilled government agent, Steve himself became the member of a new incarnation of the Justice League of America.

Characterization

Personality
The character was designed to be a complement to Wonder Woman's character.  Chris Pine described Trevor as a "rogue-ish, cynical realist who's seen the awful brutish nature of modern civilization" and added he is a "worldly guy, a charming guy". Steve Trevor gave Diana the nickname, "Angel", because having been delirious from his injuries, Themyscira seemed heaven-like with her being the "angel" that saved him. Throughout his comic book appearances Steve is often shown to have a strong moral compass and has been depicted as jaded and even insubordinate towards his superior officers if he deems their decisions to be unethical. 

Steve Trevor is the first foreigner to have ever set foot on Themyscira, the first man Diana has ever seen, and the first ambassador to open diplomatic relations with the Amazons. Trevor, Superman and Batman are the only men in the DC Universe to be granted honorary citizenship by  Queen Hippolyta; an extraordinary feat, given that Aphrodite's Law demands the death penalty for any man who sets foot on Themyscira. He was often Diana's primary love interest and their relationship was usually a flirtatious one, yet they always remained steadfast friends. On occasion, Marston would place Trevor in "gentleman-in-jeopardy" situations as an appropriate male version of the damsel in distress trope. His marriage proposals were often rejected, as Diana prioritized saving the world first before marriage, in accordance with Aphrodite's Law. In more recent years Steve and Diana's relationships in the comics have become more platonic, or at times either of their love is unrequited.

Fictional character biography

20th century

Golden Age
In the original version of Wonder Woman's origin story, Steve Trevor was an intelligence officer in the United States Army Air Forces during World War II whose plane crashed on Paradise Island, the isolated homeland of the Amazons. He was nursed back to health by the Amazon princess Diana, who fell in love with him and accompanied him when he returned to the outside world. There she became Wonder Woman (and also his coworker, Diana Prince).

Steve Trevor was portrayed as a blonde military hero who often fought battles both alone and alongside Wonder Woman. At the same time, he was also a traditional superhero's love interest and gentleman-in-jeopardy: getting kidnapped and being rescued from peril by Wonder Woman, as well as pining after the superheroine in the red-and-blue outfit while failing to notice her resemblance to his meek, bespectacled secretary Diana Prince. Although, at times, Steve has rescued Wonder Woman.
The character was purposely made blond, which stemmed from William Moulton Marston’s belief that the best romantic combination is a blue-eyed brunette girl to a light-haired man, because blond males are more submissive to brunette females, according to him.

Silver and Bronze Age
After Marston's death, much of the original supporting cast paid less attention to him. Under writer-editor Robert Kanigher, both his and Diana's personalities were compromised considerably, with Steve beginning to seem threatened by his heroine's power, and Diana almost beginning to seem apologetic about it.

During the '50s and '60s, comic writers regularly made Wonder Woman lovesick over Steve Trevor, here a Major in the United States Army. Stories frequently featured Wonder Woman hoping or imagining what it would be like to marry Steve Trevor. As with Superman stories of the same period, the question of marriage was never far from the couple's minds. There was also considerable attention given to the threat of the Amazon's secret identity being revealed.

Wonder Woman often found herself agreeing to Steve's contests for her hand in marriage, which he typically cheated at using government tracking equipment. Afraid that she loved someone else; Steve once again misused government spying equipment to stalk Wonder Woman, finding her with her childhood boyfriend Mer-Man; whom he felt the need to prove himself better than.

In 1968, Diana chose to give up her powers and cut ties with her native Paradise Island to stay close to Steve. Trevor was killed off in the next issue. He was thus absent for the next few years of the comic. In the mid-1970s, following the return of the heroine's powers, Trevor was brought back to life by Aphrodite, and given a new identity as the brunette Steve Howard. In 1978, he was killed off again. He would be replaced in 1980 by a double from another, undisclosed dimension of the Multiverse. For the next few years the classic relationship of Wonder Woman and Steve Trevor would be essentially restored, and explored with some detail. In 1985 with issue #322, writer Dan Mishkin dealt with Trevor's three separate "lives", and after much explanation merged the "new" Steve with the old.

During this same period in early 1980s issues of Wonder Woman, the villainous Doctor Psycho fused Steve's image with Wonder Woman's abilities and became "Captain Wonder", sporting a costume similar to Wonder Woman's. In the final issue of the original Wonder Woman series, Steve and Diana get married.

Modern Age
The 1985 comic book storyline "Crisis on Infinite Earths" retconned, or rebooted the fictional continuity of the DC Universe. At the end of the storyline, the Wonder Woman and retired four-star General Steve Trevor of pre-Crisis Earth-Two traveled to Mount Olympus to live with the Greek gods and goddesses, as many of the other pre-Crisis Earth-Two heroes died or merged into a new streamlined continuity. The Wonder Woman of pre-Crisis Earth-One was devolved back into the mystical clay from which she was formed (technically dying), thus allowing Wonder Woman and her supporting characters to be re-introduced with new origins, backgrounds and plotlines.

With the restart of the series in the second volume after "Crisis on Infinite Earths", Steve Trevor was revamped to be considerably older than Diana. In addition, the two of them never had a romantic relationship. Years before Trevor's crash landing on Themyscira (the modern name for Paradise Island), his lost mother, Diana Rockwell Trevor, a pilot for the Women Airforce Service Pilots, had also crashed there, finding the Amazons battling a large monster. Seeing they were close to defeat, Diana Trevor used her pistol on the beast, giving the Amazons an advantage in the battle. Trevor dies as a result. After her death the Amazons considered the outworlder to be an honored hero for her sacrifice. It is from her that Queen Hippolyta named her daughter Diana and also from her that the Amazons came into possession of a gun originating from Man's World. It is this familial link that led the god Ares to manipulate Steve into bombing Themyscira to eliminate the Amazons. However while in flight and guided to the island, Trevor realized he was about to needlessly bomb civilians and attempted to abort the mission. Steve's co-pilot, a minion of the war-god, transforms into a monster in an attempt to continue the attack. Diana rescues Steve from the resulting disaster.

Bringing the unconscious Trevor to the island, Diana recognized his American flag insignia on his uniform mirrored her own armor's color motif and took this as a sign of where she had to go to begin her fight against Ares. Thus inspired, Diana took Trevor to 'Man's World' in the city of Boston and began her calling. Since then, Trevor and Diana have been close friends despite him being old enough to be her father. This version of Steve Trevor went on to marry Etta Candy and became the Deputy Secretary of Defense for the U.S. government.

21st century

"Infinite Crisis"
Following the 2005–2006 "Infinite Crisis" storyline, Wonder Woman's origin was yet again revamped, as was her supporting cast. Diana is no longer a recent arrival to man's world, but instead has lived in it for some time, having been involved in the creation of the Justice League of America (as was the case in the group's Silver Age introductory story in 1960). Although Steve Trevor still remains close friends with Diana and married to Etta, his history with Diana has not fully been developed.

The New 52
In the aftermath of the 2011 "Flashpoint" storyline, DC Comics cancelled all of their monthly books and relaunched them with a rebooted continuity, in an initiative called The New 52. In this continuity, Steve Trevor is a long-time advocate for the Amazons, having lobbied the U.S. government for peace with the Amazons, arguing that they are benevolent. Steve then becomes Wonder Woman's U.N. liaison during her stay in Washington, D.C. and later becomes the head of the newly formed A.R.G.U.S., (Advanced Research Group for Uniting Super-Humans), as well as the UN's liaison to the newly formed Justice League. Promoted to the rank of Colonel, his assistant is Etta Candy and he has made his feelings and attraction to Wonder Woman clear to her, although his feelings were not reciprocated. The hero Black Orchid is revealed to be A.R.G.U.S. Agent Alba Garcia, working covertly for Justice League Dark to monitor John Constantine.

Trevor is also a member of several team books, including Team 7, which launched in September 2012, and Justice League of America, launched in 2013.

The pre-"Crisis on Infinite Earths" version of Trevor seen in the 2015 "Convergence" storyline works with Diana and Etta Candy to better the fate of Earth One's Gotham City while stuck under an alien dome for a year. When vampiric versions of Gotham criminals from Earth-43 invade a makeshift church service, it is up to Diana and Steve to keep them from spilling out into the streets. Steve falls prey to the vampires, arising as one of them. However, he manages to maintain his own free will, taking down a vampire and falling under the rubble of the collapsing church.

DC Rebirth
As part of DC Comics' 2016 relaunch of its monthly titles and their continuity, DC Rebirth, Wonder Woman's origin is retold in the "Year One" storyline. Steve crashes on the island of Themyscira and is the sole survivor. He is saved and nursed back to health by the Amazons, and a competition is held to determine the one to take Steve and the bodies of his fallen comrades back to America, one that Diana wins. In the United States, Trevor relates to the authorities his experiences with the Amazons and Diana, and the two become allies in subsequent conflicts with terrorists, the Greek god of war Ares, a global virus, an African cult, a paramilitary group called Poison, and the supervillain group Godwatch.

Other versions

Justice
The Silver Age Steve Trevor makes an appearance in Alex Ross' 2005–2007 miniseries Justice. He is among the sidekicks and loved ones attacked by the Legion of Doom, and can be seen embracing Wonder Woman.

Wonder Woman: Amazonia
In the Elseworlds story Wonder Woman: Amazonia, Stephen Trevor is a Royal Marine who tricks the Amazons into being loyal, but then calls down the British Empire and slaughters them all except Diana. He brings her to Man's World to put her into stage plays re-enacting Biblical stories. Diana later kills Stephen as revenge.

Amalgam
In the alternate universe depicted in Amalgam Comics, Steve Trevor is fused with The Punisher/Frank Castle to form Trevor Castiglione/Trevor Castle. A seasoned combat veteran who went AWOL after his wife and children were caught in a Mafia ceasefire and were killed, Castle decided to begin a one-man war on crime. After being wounded in a gunfight, he was saved by rogue Amazon princess Diana Prince (who left Themyscira by herself without becoming Wonder Woman in this world, the title being given to this universe's version of Storm instead), leading the two to start a romantic relationship that led to marriage and the birth of their son Ryan. However the two eventually separated over their differences until Ryan was kidnapped, forcing the two to work together. After learning that Thanoseid (an amalgam of Thanos and Darkseid) was responsible, they tried to get Ryan back only to fail when he seemingly killed their child. However, in reality Thanoseid had only sent their son back in time to become his personal assassin Kanto, which Diana figured out and revealed. Thanoseid, who had wanted revenge for the death of his son Orion and had hoped Castle or Kanto would die at the hands of the other, sent everyone back where they belong. Castle and Diana then decided to get back together.

Flashpoint
In the alternate timeline of the 2011 "Flashpoint" storyline, Steve and Wonder Woman have no relationship; instead, it appears that he is in love with Lois Lane. Steve made an appearance in London where he is waiting at a rendezvous point for Lois Lane as he is attacked by Wonder Woman and the Amazons. Wonder Woman catches him by the neck with her Lasso of Truth and begins interrogating him after he is temporarily able to resist the lasso's effects. He explains that he was hired to extract Lois Lane from New Themyscira because she was sent to gather information on the Amazons for Cyborg who's amassing superhumans to stop the fighting between Wonder Woman and Aquaman. Steve's fate comes to an end when Wonder Woman strangles him to death.

Wonder Woman: Earth One
Steve Trevor appears in the 2016 original graphic novel Wonder Woman: Earth One in a similar manner to his original counterpart, though this time presented as African-American.

The Legend of Wonder Woman
Steve Trevor appears as a major supporting character in the Legend of Wonder Woman, an alternate re-telling of Wonder Woman's origin that debuted in 2016 by writer Greg Rucka. Similar to Marston's original comics, the young pilot Steve Trevor crash lands on Paradise Island.

In other media

Television

Live-action

 Steve Trevor appears in Wonder Woman (1974), portrayed by Kaz Garas.
 Steve Leonard Trevor Sr. and Jr. appear in Wonder Woman (1975), both portrayed by Lyle Waggoner. Both Trevors are allies of Wonder Woman and U.S. Air Force officers and pilots, with Trevor Sr. having fought in WWII and Trevor Jr. in the 1970s.
 Steve Trevor appears in Wonder Woman (2011), portrayed by Justin Bruening. This version is a Justice Department lawyer.

Animation
 Steve Trevor makes a non-speaking cameo appearance in the Super Friends: The Legendary Super Powers Show episode "Mr. Mxyzptlk and the Magic Lamp".
 Steve Trevor appears in The Super Powers Team: Galactic Guardians episode "The Darkseid Deception", voiced by Darryl Hickman. This version is an astronaut.
 Steve Trevor appears in the Justice League three-part episode "The Savage Time", voiced by Patrick Duffy. This version is an Allied secret agent. After being rescued by a time-traveling Wonder Woman, who joined the Justice League in traveling back in time to stop Vandal Savage from helping Nazi Germany win WWII, she and Trevor develop a brief, flirtatious relationship before she returns to the present.
 Steve Trevor appears in Batman: The Brave and the Bold, voiced by Sean Donnellan.
 A young, contemporary Steve Trevor appears in DC Super Hero Girls (2019), voiced by Yuri Lowenthal. This version's presence distracts Wonder Woman. In the episode "#CrushingIt", he enrolls in Metropolis High School after being rejected from a military academy. In the episode "#DCSuperHeroBoys", he becomes the leader of the "Invincibros" despite his lack of powers or combat training because the other members believe him to be wise.

Film

Live-action 

Captain Steve Trevor appears in films set in the DC Extended Universe (DCEU), portrayed by Chris Pine.

 Introduced in Wonder Woman (2017), this version is a United States Army Air Service pilot with the 94th Aero Squadron and the American Expeditionary Forces and an Allied spy during World War I. After stealing information on a deadlier form of mustard gas being developed by Doctor Isabel Maru on General Erich Ludendorff's behalf, Trevor crashes his plane on Themyscira, where Diana Prince learns of the war he is involved in and leaves with him to end it. As Trevor guides her into the world outside of Themyscira and how mankind functions, they grow closer despite conflicts over how to stop the war, with him focusing on stopping Maru while she wants to kill Ares. Ultimately, Trevor tells Prince that he loves her and leaves her his father's watch as a keepsake before hijacking a German strategic bomber containing the gas and sacrificing himself to incinerate it at a safe distance. This act leads to Prince believing the world can only be saved through love, not hatred.
 In Wonder Woman 1984, Prince comes into contact with the Dreamstone and unknowingly wishes for Trevor to come back to life, causing his soul to manifest in the body of an unnamed man (portrayed by Kristoffer Polaha), with Prince recognizing him as the former while everyone else sees the latter. While guiding him through the 1980s, among other changes since WWI, they work together to find out more about the Dreamstone and stop Maxwell Lord, who acquired the Dreamstone's powers and is unknowingly causing global chaos, as well as Barbara Ann Minerva, Prince's friend who became more violent after making her own wish with the Dreamstone. Upon realizing Prince is losing her powers as a result of her wish, Trevor eventually persuades her to renounce it. Reluctantly, she lets him go and does so before stopping Lord and Minerva.

Animation
 Steve Trevor appears in Wonder Woman (2009), voiced by Nathan Fillion. This version is a U.S. Air Force Colonel who goes by the call sign "Zipper" and crash-landed on Dinosaur Island before accompanying Wonder Woman to the outside world.
 The Flashpoint incarnation of Steve Trevor appears in Justice League: The Flashpoint Paradox, voiced by James Patrick Stuart.
 Steve Trevor appears in the DC Animated Movie Universe (DCAMU) film Justice League: War, voiced by George Newbern. Similarly to his New 52 counterpart, this version is a government liaison to Wonder Woman, and later the Justice League.
 Steve Trevor appears in the DCAMU film Justice League: Throne of Atlantis, voiced again by George Newbern. As of this film, he has grown a beard.
 An alternate universe incarnation of Steve Trevor appears in Justice League: Gods and Monsters, voiced by Tahmoh Penikett. This version is an informant and lover of Bekka / Wonder Woman.
 Steve Trevor appears in the DCAMU film Wonder Woman: Bloodlines, voiced by Jeffrey Donovan.
 An alternate universe incarnation of Steve Trevor appears in Justice Society: World War II, voiced by Chris Diamantopoulos. This version is a colonel and member of the Justice Society of America (JSA) who hails from Earth-2. While helping the JSA and the Flash of Earth-1 foil the Advisor and Aquaman's plans, Trevor is killed by the former.

Miscellaneous
 Steve Trevor appears in Wonder Woman '77.
 Steve Trevor appears in Smallville Season 11.
 The Gods and Monsters incarnation of Steve Trevor appears in the Justice League: Gods and Monsters Chronicles episode "Big", voiced again by Tahmoh Penikett.
 Steve Trevor appears in DC Super Hero Girls (2015), voiced by Josh Keaton. This version is a waiter at the Capes and Cowls Cafe, which is owned by his father.
 Steve Trevor appears in Injustice 2 Annual #1. This version is a Nazi agent who, after crash-landing on Themyscira, secretly killed an Amazon named Calliope before tricking Wonder Woman into leaving with him under the pretense of stopping Nazi Germany. Despite his love for Wonder Woman, he is unable to love a woman more than his country, leading to her killing him and taking on more ruthless ethics.

References

External links
Justice League Animated Bio
Marston, William Moulton. Emotions Of Abnormal People. London: Kegan Paul, Trench, Trübner & Co, Ltd. 1928.  
STEVE TREVOR:Revelations of a mysterious boyfriend, (Articles) (2011), Jett, Brett.
FIRST MEETINGS: How old were Steve & Diana?, (Article) (2014), Jett, Brett.
Steve Trevor Silver Age Chronology (part 1)
Steve Trevor Silver Age Chronology (part 2)
Steve Trevor Post-Crisis Chronology

Characters created by H. G. Peter
Characters created by William Moulton Marston
Comics characters introduced in 1941
DC Comics male superheroes
DC Comics military personnel
DC Comics spies
Fictional astronauts
Fictional British secret agents
Fictional Central Intelligence Agency personnel
Fictional colonels
Fictional generals
Fictional majors
Fictional Office of Strategic Services personnel
Fictional United Nations personnel
Fictional United States Air Force personnel
Fictional United States Army personnel
Fictional World War II veterans
Male characters in film
Wonder Woman characters
Fictional fighter pilots